Tappan Zee High School is a public high school located in Orangeburg, New York in Rockland County. The school serves students in grades 9-12 and is part of the South Orangetown Central School District. The school derives its name from the nearby Tappan Zee section of the Hudson River.

The school draws students from Orangetown, New York, which comprises the villages and hamlets of Blauvelt, Grandview, Orangeburg, Tappan, Palisades, Piermont, Upper Grandview, Sparkill, and portions of South Nyack.

As of the 2021–22 school year, the school had an enrollment of 945 students and 89.6 classroom teachers (on an FTE basis), for a student–teacher ratio of 10.66:1. There were 144 students (15.2% of enrollment) eligible for free lunch and 21 (2.2% of students) eligible for reduced-cost lunch.

In 2006, the school dedicated new athletic fields, including an artificial turf football/lacrosse field surrounded by a new track. The football field also has lights and bathrooms. The renovation also included new baseball and softball fields and new tennis courts.

In 2019, the school replaced the artificial turf field that was installed in 2006 with a newer version.  Besides new designs, this new version was more environmentally friendly, as it does not contain the pieces of crumbled tires that were present in the 2006 renovation.

The principal is Rudy Arietta.

Extracurricular activities

Clubs 
Tappan Zee High School offers different clubs for students after school. This includes Academic League, Aquaponics, Chess Club, D.E.C.A., Drama Club, French Club, GSTA (Gay Straight Transgender Alliance), Japanese Club, Leo Club, Math Team, Model U.N., Multi-Cultural Club, Robotics Club, S.A.D.D.(Students Against Destructive Decisions), Science Olympiad, Social Justice Club, Spanish Club, Tapress (school newspaper), Tones (school literary magazine), Yearbook, and Youth and Government.

In 2021, a Tappan Zee High School student was elected Youth Governor for the New York State Youth and Government Conference.

In addition, Tappan Zee High School hosts a play in the fall and a musical in the spring every year.

Honor Societies 
The high school has multiple honor societies that students can apply for, such as National Honor Society, Computer Science Honor Society, History Honor Society, English Honor Society, Science Honor Society, Mu Alpha Theta, French Honor Society, Italian Honor Society, and Spanish Honor Society.

Criteria for different honor societies vary. For example, students can join Mu Alpha Theta at the end of their freshman year, but cannot apply to the National Honor Society until their junior year.

Music 
Students at Tappan Zee High School are offered multiple music classes, such as Singing Actor, Interactive Music, and Chorale Conducting. Students who take music lessons privately can join the Applied Music class, which does not involve taking a class during the school day, but some paperwork is required from the private teacher. Some classes require an audition, including Chorale, Concert Band, Concert Orchestra, Symphonic Wind Ensemble, Symphonic Orchestra, and Concert Choir.

Students can also join musical clubs, such as Accafellas, Bella Acapella, Chamber Orchestra, Handbell Choir, Jazz Ensemble, Pep Band, and Quartet Club.

Sports 
Tappan Zee High School has multiple teams in numerous sports.

Fall teams 

 Football (Junior Varsity and Varsity, only boys' teams)
 Soccer (Junior Varsity and Varsity, girls' and boys' teams)
 Tennis (Junior Varsity and Varsity, only girls' teams with boys' team competing in spring)
 Volleyball (Junior Varsity and Varsity, only girls' teams)
 Cross Country (Varsity, girls' and boys' teams)
 Swimming (Varsity, only girls' team with boys' team competing in winter)
 Cheerleading (Varsity, Coed)

Winter teams 

 Basketball (Freshman, Junior Varsity, and Varsity boys' teams, Junior Varsity and Varsity girls' teams)
 Ice Hockey (Junior Varsity and Varsity)
 Wrestling (Junior Varsity and Varsity, only boys' teams)
 Swimming (Varsity, only boys' team with girls' team competing in fall)
 Indoor Track & Field (Varsity)
 Bowling (Varsity, girls' and boys' teams)
 Fencing (Junior Varsity and Varsity for épée and foil, girls' and boys' teams)
 Cheerleading (Varsity, Coed)
 Skiing (Intramural, boys' and girls' teams)

Spring teams 

 Baseball (Junior Varsity and Varsity)
 Softball (Junior Varsity and Varsity)
 Golf (Varsity)
 Tennis (Junior Varsity and Varsity, only boys' team with girls' team competing in fall)
 Outdoor Track & Field (Varsity)
 Lacrosse (Junior Varsity and Varsity, girls' and boys' teams)

In addition to playing on a team, junior and senior varsity athletes can join VAASA, Varsity Athletes Against Substance Abuse.

Student government 
Students elect multiple people to represent them. The student government is known as the Student Organization. Each grade elects eight delegates. In addition to the 32 delegates, the entire student body elects four officers: a president, a vice president, a secretary, and a treasurer. The Student Organization, often referred to as S.O., runs multiple events throughout the year, such as fundraisers for different charities, book drives, a spirit week, and a pep rally. The most recent pep rally in September 2019.

Students in each grade also elect a class president, vice president, secretary, and treasurer. The class officers' only capacity is to fundraise for their class's prom, which occurs at the end of their senior year. They do this by holding fundraisers, such as selling class shirts and rings.

Notable alumni
 Salman Ahmad, musician
 Neil Berg, composer/lyricist
 Alan Jacobs, film director, screenwriter and producer
 Brian Jagde, Opera performer
 Brian O'Connell (born 1963), musician 
 Hayden Panettiere, actress
 Michael Rispoli (born 1960), character actor who appeared in The Sopranos as Jackie Aprile, Sr.
 Brooke Smith, actress
 Blaise Winter, NFL Player

Notable faculty
Alen Hadzic, coach of the boys and girls varsity fencing team, and fencer

References

External links
School web page

Public high schools in New York (state)
Schools in Rockland County, New York